Heuchera parishii is a species of flowering plant in the saxifrage family known by the common names Mill Creek alumroot and Parish's alumroot. It is endemic to California, where it is found in the San Bernardino Mountains. This is a rhizomatous perennial herb producing a patch of lobed, kidney-shaped leaves up to four centimeters wide. It bears an erect inflorescence up to about 27 centimeters in height which blooms in dense clusters of salmon-pink flowers. The plant gets its common name from Mill Creek.

External links
Jepson Manual Treatment
Photo gallery

parishii
Endemic flora of California
Flora without expected TNC conservation status